The synagogue of Lausanne is a synagogue located on Avenue de Florimont in Lausanne, Vaud, Switzerland.

History
In the early 20th century, the Jewish community gathered in the  building on Rue du Grand-Chêne in Lausanne. The community grew rapidly and wanted to have a larger place of worship.

Upon the death of French merchant Daniel Iffla ("Osiris"), the City Council of Lausanne received a bequest of 50,000 francs. This donation aimed at building a new synagogue which had to be inspired from the Buffault Synagogue in Paris.

The synagogue was built in 1909–1910 thanks to the financial support of the local Ashkenazi community. The City of Lausanne also allocated 300,000 francs for the construction. The building was designed by Vaudois architects Charles Bonjour, Adrien van Dorsser and Oscar Oulevey and inaugurated on November 7, 1910.

The cost of land acquisition and construction totalled 280,000 francs, including 48,000 francs for the structural system and 28,000 francs for the decoration and the furniture.

After WWII, the community grew and integrated Sepharadi Jews, which requested unity in the rites and the use of the synagogue.

In 2010, Israelite Community of Lausanne and the Canton of Vaud (CILV) celebrated the centenary of the synagogue and organised events aimed at "forging bonds with Lausanne and Vaud people", including an exhibition about the history of the synagogue.

The synagogue is now listed among the Cultural Property of National Significance. It is used for Shabbat celebrations, but usually the daily service takes place in a smaller underground room. In 1995, a liturgical music concert took place at the synagogue.

Architecture
The Romanesque-Byzantine synagogue has a long nave that can be reached from the vestibule. Three sides of the nave are bordered by galleries with 160 seats for women. The stalls are dedicated to men only. The Almemohr has a tabernacle with the Torah scrolls, as well as the seat used by the rabbi. The paintings were made by Otto Alfred Briffod and the stained-glass windows were manufactured by the workshop Guignard & Schmid. There is an adjacent sacristy. The underground floor has several locales.

See also
History of the Jews in Switzerland
List of cultural property of national significance in Switzerland: Vaud

References

Bibliography
 
.
 

Ashkenazi Jewish culture in Switzerland
Ashkenazi synagogues
Synagogues in Switzerland
20th-century synagogues
Synagogues completed in 1910
Buildings and structures in Lausanne
Cultural property of national significance in the canton of Vaud
Sephardi Jewish culture in Switzerland
20th-century architecture in Switzerland